ICSE may refer to:

 International Conference on Software Engineering
 Indian Certificate of Secondary Education